The Romanized Popular Alphabet (RPA) or Hmong RPA (also Roman Popular Alphabet), is a system of romanization for the various dialects of the Hmong language. Created in Laos between 1951 and 1953 by a group of missionaries and Hmong advisers, it has gone on to become the most widespread system for writing the Hmong language in the West. It is also used in Southeast Asia and China alongside other writing systems, most notably Nyiakeng Puachue Hmong and Pahawh Hmong.

History
In Xiangkhoang Province, Protestant missionary G. Linwood Barney began working on the writing system with speakers of Green Mong (Mong Leng), Geu Yang and Tua Xiong, among others. He consulted with William A. Smalley, a missionary studying the Khmu language in Luang Prabang Province at the time. Concurrently, Yves Bertrais, a Roman Catholic missionary in Kiu Katiam, Luang Prabang, was undertaking a similar project with Chong Yeng Yang and Chue Her Thao. The two working groups met in 1952 and reconciled any differences by 1953 to produce a version of the script.

Orthography
The alphabet was developed to write both the Hmong Der (White Hmong, RPA: Hmoob Dawb) and Mong Leng (Green/Blue Mong, RPA: Moob Leeg) dialects. While these dialects have much in common, each has unique sounds. Consonants and vowels found only in Hmong Der (denoted with †) or Green Mong (denoted with ⁂) are color-coded respectively. Some writers make use of variant spellings. Much as with Tosk for Albanian, Hmong Der was arbitrarily chosen to be the "standard" variant.

Consonants and vowels

The glottal stop is not indicated in the orthography. The few truly vowel-initial words are indicated by an apostrophe, which thus acts as a zero consonant.

Tones
RPA indicates tone by letters written at the end of a syllable, like Gwoyeu Romatzyh rather than with diacritics like those used in the Vietnamese alphabet or Pinyin. Unlike Vietnamese and Chinese, all Hmong syllables end in a vowel, which means that using consonant letters to indicate tone will be neither confusing nor ambiguous.

 represents a phrase-final low-rising variant of the creaky tone

See also

 Standard Zhuang

Notes

Bibliography

External links
Hmong Language FAQ, David Mortensen
Mong Literacy – includes lessons on writing Mong Leng with RPA
http://www.hmongrpa.org/

Phonetic alphabets
Latin alphabets
Romanization
West Hmongic languages